George T. Cunningham was the founder of Cunningham's, the 52-store British Columbia pharmacy chain that later became part of Shoppers Drug Mart. Cunningham was also an alderman, a member of the Vancouver School Board and was on the Board of Governors of the University of British Columbia for 30 years. He was awarded an honorary doctorate from the university after his death for his philanthropy, public service and dedication to education.

References 

Businesspeople from Vancouver
Canadian philanthropists
Year of birth missing
Year of death missing